Speed Racer is a arcade racing game designed by Namco based on the popular Japanese anime Speed Racer. The standard cabinet was a two-player, sit-down model.

Reception
A reviewer for Next Generation praised the use of "trickery" against racing opponents but criticized the track design, and concluded that "this is good kiddy gaming, and no more." He gave it two out of five stars.

References

External links

Speed Racer video games
1995 video games
Racing video games
Arcade video games
Arcade-only video games
Namco arcade games
Video games developed in Japan
Video games scored by Shinji Hosoe